Batulasen is a small town in Achham District in the Seti Zone of western Nepal. According to the 1991 Nepal census, the village had a population of 3053 living in 592 houses. At the time of the 2001 Nepal census, the population was 3587, of which 37% was literate.

References

Populated places in Achham District
Village development committees in Achham District